was the tenth of twenty-four s, built for the Imperial Japanese Navy following World War I. When introduced into service, these ships were the most powerful destroyers in the world. They served as first-line destroyers through the 1930s, and remained formidable weapons systems well into the Pacific War.

History
Construction of the advanced Fubuki-class destroyers was authorized as part of the Imperial Japanese Navy's expansion program from fiscal 1923, intended to give Japan a qualitative edge with the world's most modern ships. The Fubuki class had performance that was a quantum leap over previous destroyer designs, so much so that they were designated . The large size, powerful engines, high speed, large radius of action and unprecedented armament gave these destroyers the firepower similar to many light cruisers in other navies. Uranami, built at the Uraga Dock Company was laid down on 28 April 1927, launched on 29 November 1928 and commissioned on 30 June 1929. Originally assigned hull designation "Destroyer No. 44", she was renamed Uranami in 1935.

Operational history
On completion, Uranami was assigned to Destroyer Division 11 under the IJN 2nd Fleet. During the Second Sino-Japanese War, Uranami helped cover landings of Japanese forces during the Battle of Shanghai in 1937, and subsequent landings of Japanese forces at Hangzhou in northern China.

World War II history
At the time of the attack on Pearl Harbor, Uranami was initially assigned to Destroyer Division 19, Squadron 3 of the IJN 1st Fleet, and had deployed from Kure Naval District to the port of Samah on Hainan Island. From 4 December 1941 to the end of the year, Uranami covered the landings of Japanese troops in "Operation E" (the invasion of Malaya) and "Operation B" (the invasion of British Borneo), capturing the Norwegian merchant ship SS Hafthor on 7 December.

On 23 March 1942, Uranami provided close cover for the "Operation D" (the invasion of the Andaman Islands. She served patrol and escort duties out of Port Blair during the Japanese raids into the Indian Ocean. On 13–22 April she returned via Singapore and Camranh Bay to Kure Naval Arsenal, for maintenance.

On 4–5 June 1942, Uranami participated in the Battle of Midway by escorting Admiral Isoroku Yamamoto's Main Body, suffering minor damage after the battle in a collision with sister ship , requiring a return to Kure Naval Arsenal for repairs. Once these repairs were complete, Uranami escorted the armed merchant cruiser Kiyozumi maru as far as Singapore and then continued on to Mergui for a projected second Indian Ocean raid. The operation was cancelled due to the Guadalcanal campaign, and Uranami was ordered to the Solomon Islands instead. During the Battle of the Eastern Solomons on 24 August Uranami escorted the fleet supply group to Guadalcanal. Throughout September and October, Uranami participated in a very large number of "Tokyo Express" high speed transport missions to Guadalcanal.

Guadalcanal
On 14–15 November, Uranami was involved in the Second Naval Battle of Guadalcanal. She was attached to a scouting force under the command of Rear Admiral Shintarō Hashimoto in the light cruiser . When American Admiral Willis A. Lee's Task Force 64 was located and attacked near Savo Island, Uranami came to the assistance of Ayanami and the light cruiser .

Fire from Ayanami, Nagara, and the Uranami sank two of the four American destroyers involved ( and ), mortally wounded  (which was scuttled after the battle), and severely damaged , causing heavy American losses in the first phase of the battle.

Soon after, Ayanami was targeted and shelled by the battleship , receiving critical damage. Uranami evacuated the crippled destroyer (which was scuttled after the battle). After the battle, Uranami escorted the aircraft carrier  from Truk to Yokosuka, returning to Rabaul in mid-February 1943 to resume patrol, escort and transport missions in the Solomons. On 25 February 1943, Uranami was reassigned to the Southwest Area Fleet. During the Battle of the Bismarck Sea on 1–4 March, Uranami sustained repeated air attacks without damage, and assisted in the rescue of survivors.

After making several escort missions in the eastern Netherlands East Indies in April, Uranami suffered severe damage on 2 April by striking a reef near Makassar. Taken to Surabaya, repairs were not complete until the end of August. Returning to patrol duty in September, Uranami escorted convoys to Singapore to the end of the year.

In early 1944, Uranami sortied from Singapore with the cruiser  on a troop transport run to Mergui and Penang, and returned alone to Singapore with the survivors of the torpedoed Kuma, which had been sunk by HMS Tally-Ho on 11 January 1944.

Convoy TA 1 to Ormoc
Uranamis final mission was the first major coordinated troop movement to Leyte during the Battle of Leyte Gulf that began 21 October 1944. The troops were to be taken from Manila via Mindanao to Ormoc. The ships involved in this mission were designated Convoy TA 1, and included heavy cruiser Aoba, light cruiser , Uranami, three new s (and ), and two new s, ( and ). The mission was led by Rear Admiral Naomasa Sakonju in Aoba.

Prior to the mission proper, on 23 October Aoba was torpedoed by the submarine  and disabled. Sakonju transferred to Kinu and had Aoba towed to port for repairs. The next morning Uranami and Kinu, fighting for Mindanao, avoided three flights from Task Force 38 as the Battle of Leyte Gulf opened. The ships only took minor damage in the strafing runs, but 4 crewmen were killed aboard Uranami and nine were wounded. Uranami also suffered a punctured fuel tank which left her leaking oil.

The actual mission began 25 October with the arrival of the transports. The Battle of Leyte Gulf was in full swing and so the convoy largely escaped American intervention. The IJA 41st Regiment was successfully delivered to Ormoc. Here, the two smaller T.101 transports broke off to pick up troops from a different location as Kinu, Uranami, and the three T.1s headed back to Manila.

On the morning of 26 October, while crossing the Jintotolo Channel between Masbate and Panay, approximately 80 aircraft from four of the escort carriers of Task Force 77.4.2 "Taffy 2" (and ) began bombing, strafing, and rocketing the convoy. Three empty transports (which had lagged behind during the battle) arrived that afternoon to pick up survivors, including 94 from Uranami. Uranami was stricken from the navy list on 10 December 1944.

The shipwreck

Notes

References

External links

Uranami in Naval History of World Wars
Long Lancers: The TA Operations to Leyte, Part I

Fubuki-class destroyers
Ships built by Uraga Dock Company
1928 ships
Second Sino-Japanese War naval ships of Japan
World War II destroyers of Japan
Destroyers sunk by aircraft
Shipwrecks in the Visayan Sea
World War II shipwrecks in the Pacific Ocean
Maritime incidents in October 1944
Ships sunk by US aircraft